Expressive Processing: Digital Fictions, Computer Games, and Software Studies is a digital media textbook authored by Noah Wardrip-Fruin and published through the MIT Press. Throughout the book Wardrip-Fruin takes a look into "expressive processing" elements that partake in digital media. Wardrip-Fruin attempts to explain expressive processing through the ELIZA effect, The Tale-Spin Effect, The SimCity Effect, and many other elements of interactive digital media.

References

External links 
Expressive Processing on MIT press
 Google Books version of Expressive Processing

Media studies textbooks
2009 non-fiction books
MIT Press books